Abdurrahman Bahir Efendi was an Ottoman composer of vocal and instrumental Turkish classical music. Bahir Efendi rose to prominence during the reign of Ahmet III.

See also 
 List of composers of classical Turkish music

References

Composers of Ottoman classical music
Composers of Turkish makam music
19th-century composers
19th-century people from the Ottoman Empire
1846 deaths
Year of birth missing